Hemeya Tanjy (born 1 May 1998) is a Mauritanian footballer who plays as a forward for Mauritanian club Nouadhibou and the Mauritania national team.

Club career
Tanjy grew up playing street football in the streets of his hometown of Nouakchott. He played for local teams such as Skok Club and Zamzam club before he was discovered by the National Football Academy, where he spent a few years.

Tanjy made his senior debut with topflight club Tidjikja, where he played for three years. He finished as the league's leading scorer in the 2017–18 season.

Tanjy signed a two-year deal with Nouadhibou in June 2018. In his first year with the club, he scored the game-winning goal in the title-clinching match against ASAC Concorde.

He finished as the leading scorer in the 2020–21 season, scoring 19 goals in 18 matches.

In December 2022, Tanjy became the first player in league history to score 100 goals.

International career
Tanjy played for the national under-20 team during the 2017 Africa U-20 Cup of Nations qualifiers in 2016, scoring twice in two matches.

In May 2018, he was named to the 22-man squad selected to play at the 2019 Africa U-23 Cup of Nations qualifiers.

He received a callup up to the senior national team in January 2018 ahead of the 2018 African Nations Championship. He made his senior international debut during the first group stage match against Morocco on 13 January, replacing Moussa Samba in the 77th minute of an eventual 4–0 defeat. Mauritania was eliminated in the group stage.

He was called up yet again for the 2019 Africa Cup of Nations in Egypt, though he did not appear in any games.

On 9 October 2020, Tanjy scored his first senior international goal in a 2–1 friendly win over Sierra Leone. He scored his second international goal on 22 June 2021, netting the second goal in a 2–0 win over Yemen that qualified Mauritania to the FIFA Arab Cup. In November 2021, Tanjy was named to the final squad for the FIFA Arab Cup.

Career statistics

International

International goals
Scores and results list Mauritania's goal tally first.

Honours

Club
Nouadhibou
 Super D1: 2018–19, 2019–20, 2020–21, 2021–22
 President's Cup: 2018

Individual
 Super D1 best young player: 2016–17
 Super D1 top scorer: 2017–18, 2020–21

References

External links
 
 
 
 

Living people
1998 births
Mauritanian footballers
Mauritania international footballers
Association football forwards
2018 African Nations Championship players
2019 Africa Cup of Nations players
2021 Africa Cup of Nations players
Mauritania under-20 international footballers
ASC Tidjikja players
FC Nouadhibou players
People from Nouakchott
Mauritania A' international footballers
2022 African Nations Championship players